General elections were held in the Netherlands on 27 August 1850.

Results

By district

Notes

References

General elections in the Netherlands
Netherlands
1850 in the Netherlands
July 1850 events
Election and referendum articles with incomplete results